Judy Berkstresser is a former American Republican politician who served in the Missouri House of Representatives.

She graduated from Crane High School and attended the College of the Ozarks.  She has worked as a cosmetologist, the owner of a beef cattle operation, the owner and operator of a dairy farm, and as a real state appraiser.

References

Living people
20th-century American politicians
21st-century American politicians
20th-century American women politicians
21st-century American women politicians
Republican Party members of the Missouri House of Representatives
Women state legislators in Missouri
Year of birth missing (living people)